La Consolacion College Baao, formerly St. Monica Academy is a private, Catholic coeducational basic and higher education institution run by the congregation of the Augustinian Sisters of Our Lady of Consolation in San Ramon, Baao, Camarines Sur, Philippines, near the St. Bartholomew Parish Church. It is the only existing private Catholic school in Baao, which offers both primary and secondary education. It is a member of Bicol Association of Catholic Schools. It is one of the well-known private Catholic school in the Rinconada area as well in Camarines Sur and the whole Bicol Region, producing both elementary and high school graduates of good quality.

History
In 1939, the Augustinian Sisters of Our Lady of Consolation were looking for a site for a school in Bicol. When the parish priest of the parish of Baao learned about this, he offered his parish as the site of the school. After the offer was accepted by the Augustinian Sisters, the sisters went back to Manila to secure a permit for the school. While they were doing this, the parish priest immediately started the construction of a two-storey building at his own expense at the lot adjacent to the parish convent. After it was finished, the building was turned over to the Augustinian Sisters.

In May 1940, the first batch of four Augustinian sisters arrived. Pending the full completion of the building being built for the sisters, they temporarily resided in the house of a prominent Baao resident named Don Tomas Guevara. In less than a month after their arrival, the finishing touches to the building were through. The sisters immediately transferred to the new building to prepare for the opening of school year 1940-1941. After preparations were completed, a Catholic school named Baao Parochial School was fully ready to operate. In its first year of operation, two hundred students were enrolled in the Kindergarten and Grades I to IV academic levels. Most of the sisters handled the classes with two lay teachers aiding them. 

The people of Baao responded positively with the opening of the school. Many residents extended their help in one way or another to the sisters and the school. Some kind-hearted families and individuals extended material assistance. They donated rice and coconut lands for the sustenance of the sisters. A landed Baao resident donated also a parcel of land to the school.

See also
La Consolacion College - Bacolod, Negros Occidental
La Consolacion College – Biñan, Laguna
La Consolacion College - Daet, Camarines Norte
La Consolacion College - Iriga, Camarines Sur
La Consolacion College – Manila, Metro Manila
 La Consolacion College – Novaliches - Caloocan, Metro Manila
La Consolacion University Philippines, Malolos, Bulacan

References

External links
NO to the Implementation of the Educational Voucher System: Retain the Education Service Contracting Scheme
Municipality of Baao

Catholic elementary schools in the Philippines
Catholic secondary schools in the Philippines
Schools in Camarines Sur